Mattia Bruno Moreni (1920–1999) was an Italian sculptor and painter. He worked within the Arte Informale art movement.

He died on 29 May 1999 in Brisighella, Emilia-Romagna, Italy.

References 

1920 births
1999 deaths
Italian painters
Italian sculptors
Accademia Albertina alumni
20th-century Italian painters
20th-century Italian male artists
Italian male painters
People from Pavia